is a Japanese retail book store chain founded in 1891 as Tōkyōdō, a book publishing company. After World War II, the company branched out into retail book sales and Tōkyōdō split into two companies: Tōkyōdō Shoten, which continued with the retail book sales part of the business, and Tōkyōdō Publishing, which continued the publishing side of the business.

The main office of Tōkyōdō Shoten is located in the Kanda-Jinbōchō area of Tokyo, sharing a building with one of its  retail stores and an office of Tōkyōdō Publishing. Its main competitors are the Sanseidō Shoten and Shosen Grande stores.

History
Hakubunkan established Tōkyōdō in 1891 as a retail book business. The company quickly moved into book publishing as well. Tōkyōdō split into two companies in 1964: Tōkyōdō Shoten and Tōkyōdō Publishing.

Retail companies based in Tokyo
Retail companies established in 1891
Bookstores of Japan
Japanese companies established in 1891